"Hot Spot" is the first single released from American female hip-hop artist Foxy Brown's second album Chyna Doll. It was released in the United States on November 10, 1998.  The single was produced by Murder Inc founder Irv Gotti and co-producer Lil' Rob, with lyrics written by Foxy Brown and hip-hop artist Jay-Z.  The single received a short-lived buzz and peaked at 91 on the Billboard Hot 100. It was the last time Foxy Brown would make her appearance on the Billboard Hot 100 as a solo artist.

Music video
The music video was released on November 16, 1998, and was directed by Joseph Kahn and Foxy Brown. The video featured Brown in a frozen ice-themed nightclub sporting a metallic bra, which was parodied on a commercial for MTV's 1999 Hip Hop Week advertisement campaign.

Track listing
US CD
(870 835-2; Released: 1999)
 "Hot Spot" (LP Version - Explicit) - 3:55
 "Big Bad Mamma" - 3:52
 "Hot Spot" (Instrumental) - 3:55
 "Hot Spot" (Video)

US 12" Vinyl
(314 566 499-1; Released: 1998)
Side A
 "Hot Spot" (Radio Edit)
 "Hot Spot" (LP Version)
 "Hot Spot" (Instrumental)
Side B
 "BWA" (Radio Edit)
 "BWA" (LP Version)
 "BWA" (Instrumental)

US 12" Vinyl Promo
(DEF 286-1; Released: 1998)
Side A
 "Hot Spot" (Radio Edit)
 "Hot Spot" (LP Version)
Side B
 "Hot Spot" (Instrumental)
 "Hot Spot" (Acapella)

Charts

Release history

References

External links
 Foxy Brown's Official MySpace Page
 

1999 singles
1999 songs
Def Jam Recordings singles
Foxy Brown (rapper) songs
Music videos directed by Joseph Kahn
Song recordings produced by Irv Gotti
Songs written by Jay-Z
Songs written by Foxy Brown (rapper)
Songs written by Irv Gotti